Sales tax in Alberta consists only of a federal consumption tax, the general goods and services tax (GST). Alberta is the only province in Canada with no provincial sales tax (PST).

History 

Prior to in 1936, existing legislation taxed specific goods and services like furs, amusements, coal, electricity, pipelines, and more. 

On April 1, 1936, Alberta became the first, and only, provincial government in Canada's history to default on a debt payment. This default resulted in Premier William Aberhart's government passing The Ultimate Purchasers Tax Act which introduced the first general sales tax in Alberta. The Act created a 2% sales tax on sales of all goods, with a few exceptions, effective May 1, 1936. Minor changes were made later in 1936 as The Ultimate Purchasers Tax Act was repealed by The Retail Sales Tax Act, 1936 .

In 1937, Aberhart's government passed An Act to amend The Ultimate Purchasers Tax Act which amended The Ultimate Purchasers Tax Act to allow the Lieutenant Governor in Council to suspend the tax indefinitely. Aberhart's government chose to suspend the tax indefinitely effective August 1, 1937 due to public backlash. The suspension of the tax became even more feasible when Patrick Burns death resulted in a nearly $1,000,000 tax payment (roughly ) which was nearly equal to revenue lost by abolishing the tax. 

In succeeding years, a growing oil industry in Alberta allowed future governments to avoid sales taxes and even post budget surpluses.  

On January 1, 1991 Prime Minister Brian Mulroney's government introduced the first general federal sales tax at 7%.  

In 1995, Ralph Klein's government introduced the Alberta Taxpayer Protection Act which legislated any general provincial sales tax be subject to a referendum. 

On July 1, 2006 Prime Minister Stephen Harper's government reduced the general federal sales tax to 6%. 

On January 1, 2008 Harper's government further reduced the general federal sales tax to 5%.

References 

Taxation in Canada
Alberta law
Sales taxes